Cascade Locks State Airport  is a public use airport located one nautical mile (2 km) northeast of the central business district of Cascade Locks, a city in Hood River County, Oregon, United States. It is owned by the Oregon Department of Aviation.

Facilities and aircraft 
Cascade Locks State Airport covers an area of 37 acres (15 ha) at an elevation of 151 feet (46 m) above mean sea level. It has one runway designated 6/24 with an asphalt surface measuring 1,800 by 30 feet (549 x 9 m). For the 12-month period ending June 17, 2011, the airport had 1,500 general aviation aircraft operations, an average of 125 per month.

References

External links 
 State Warning Airports: Cascade Locks at Oregon Department of Aviation
 Aerial image as of July 1993 from USGS The National Map

Airports in Hood River County, Oregon